New Zealander Sikhs number over 40,000 people and account for 0.9% of New Zealand's population as of 2018, forming the country's fifth-largest and fastest-growing religious group.

Small numbers of Sikh immigrants from Punjab settled in New Zealand from the late 1800s. Large-scale Sikh immigration began after changes to immigration policies in the 1980s. The New Zealand Sikh Society was established in 1964 and first Sikh Gurdwara opened in 1977.

Demographics

Sikh communities

The first identifiable Sikhs to arrive in New Zealand were two brothers - Phuman Singh and Bir Singh Gill from the Moga district of Punjab. Bir Singh was a herbalist who married and lived amongst the Māori on the North Island. A small wave of Sikhs arrived in New Zealand between 1890 and 1910; mostly immigrants from Punjab. Most Sikhs settled in Waikato, Auckland, Wellington, or Christchurch.

There is a significant history of many Sikhs being dairy farmers throughout New Zealand, many of them being great pioneers. The majority are in the Waikato region and have been there for many generations. Much hard work was undertaken in terms of clearing scrub and tea trees to convert to farmland in the early years. Embracing the Māori culture was also an important aspect. Many of these farmers are well respected within and outside the community for the significant contribution they have made.

With the Sikh community in New Zealand increasing, the New Zealand Sikh Society was developed in 1964, and the first gurdwara was built in Hamilton in 1977 and another in 1986 in Otahuhu. With the increasing number of Sikhs in New Zealand, an increasing number of gurdwaras have been established across the country.

The number of people affiliating with the Sikh religion more than quadrupled since 2006. Papatoetoe in Auckland is considered to be the area with the most Sikhs in New Zealand and it has three sikh Gurudwaras in the suburb.

Gurdwaras

The New Zealand Central Sikh Association, a centralised representative Sikh body comprising 25 Gurdwaras and various other organisation from across New Zealand was officially formed on 18 September 2022 at the Sikh Library in Takanini.

This is a list of Gurdwaras in New Zealand.

Notable Sikhs
 Ish Sodhi – Cricketer for New Zealand National Team
 Kanwal Singh Bakshi – Former National Party MP
 Sukhi Turner – Former mayor of Dunedin
 Bhupinder Singh - Former Cricketer for Auckland cricket team
  Amandeep Singh - Former Cricketer for Canterbury Wizards

See also

Religion in New Zealand
 Sikhism in Australia
 Sikhism in Canada
 Sikhism in the United Kingdom
 Sikhism in the United States
 Sikhism in Fiji
Sikh diaspora
Sikhism by country
Punjabi New Zealanders

References